Hakkı Ketenoğlu (1906 - 1977) was a Turkish judge. He was president of the Constitutional Court of Turkey from December 15, 1970 until July 14, 1971.

References

External links
Web-site of the Constitutional Court of Turkey 

Turkish judges
Turkish civil servants
1906 births
1977 deaths
Presidents of the Constitutional Court of Turkey